Alagie Nyabally (born 15 November 1991) is a Gambian international footballer who plays for Gambia Ports Authority as a goalkeeper.

Career
Born in Sukuta, he has played club football for Bakau United, Real de Banjul, Tusker and Gambia Ports Authority.

He made his international debut for Gambia in 2015.

References

1991 births
Living people
Gambian footballers
The Gambia international footballers
Bakau United FC players
Real de Banjul FC players
Tusker F.C. players
Gambia Ports Authority FC players
Association football goalkeepers
Gambian expatriate footballers
Gambian expatriate sportspeople in Kenya
Expatriate footballers in Kenya